Victorian Plumbing is a British eCommerce company listed on the London Stock Exchange's Alternative Investment Market (AIM). The company specialises in bathroom related products. It also completed the largest ever IPO on the London Stock Exchange's Alternative Investment Market.

Overview
The organisation has no physical retail outlets. Instead, it stocks its products at a central warehouses, sells them via its website, and delivers them directly to its customer's properties. At the time of their initial public offering, the company claimed that eighty-six per cent of its sales came from retail customers.

History
Mark Radcliffe founded the company in 2000. Radcliffe began his career selling mobile phone accessories on eBay. Radcliffe claims to have started the business from his parents' shed after setting up a website for his father, who restored Victorian bathrooms for recreational purposes. The organisation employs approximately five-hundred and forty people at its headquarters in Merseyside and its premises in Birmingham. 

The company claims that it raised £11.6 million in new money to cover most of the costs of the IPO. JPMorgan is believed to be among the group's largest non-family shareholders post-IPO.

IPO
On June 22nd 2021, the company floated on the Alternative Investment Market with a market capitalisation of £850 million. Before the IPO, the company's sales grew by forty-five per cent in the last two quarters of the 2020 financial year.

The company's stock debuted at 262 pence per share and closed at 330 pence per share, giving it a £1.4bn valuation. 

Following the IPO, the Financial Times reported that the company's shares rose by a fifth, giving the organisation a £1 billion valuation making it the largest initial public offering in the history of London's junior market. 

Its founder divested £212M worth of shares, reducing his share to 46 per cent. Radcliffe's brother and mother own a twenty per cent stake between them.

References
6. https://www.business-live.co.uk/retail-consumer/victorian-plumbing-completes-largest-ever-20871324
Plumbing materials companies
British companies established in 2000
Companies based in Merseyside
Home improvement companies of the United Kingdom